Hantzschia is a genus of diatoms belonging to the family Bacillariaceae.

The genus was first described by Albert Grunow in 1877.

The genus name of Hantzschia is in honour of Carl August Hantzsch (1825 - 1886), who was a German botanist (Algology).

Species:
 Hantzschia amphioxys
 Hantzschia spectabilis
 Hantzschia virgata

References

Bacillariales
Diatom genera